Santa Lucia is a former ancient Roman Catholic church in central Bologna, located on Via Castiglione 36. The building's facade was never completed and is made of brick, some of which is deteriorating. The interior features Baroque architecture and is used as a lecture hall by the University of Bologna.

History 
The original church was built in the year 432 and assigned its titular saint by San Petronio. In 903, it was ruined by the Hungarian invasion of 903. In 1208, the Order of Canons Lateran rebuilt another church and officiated there until 1418. In the 1500s, the church and the adjacent convent became property of the Jesuits who rebuilt it again. In 1623, the interiors were refurbished by Girolamo Rainaldi in a style recalling the mother church of the Jesuit order, the Gesù in Rome.

In 1775, the Jesuits were suppressed and the church briefly passed to the Barnabite order, only to be cloistered by Napoleonic forces. The interior has a chapel dedicated Saint Louis Gonzaga with an altar (1763) designed by Alfonso Torreggiani.

See also
 List of Jesuit sites

References 

Roman Catholic churches in Bologna
Baroque architecture in Bologna
16th-century Roman Catholic church buildings in Italy